XXXV is the twenty-second studio album by Fairport Convention. It is subtitled "The 35th Anniversary Album", and was released in celebration of the band's existence from 1967–2002.

Track listing

 "Madeleine"  (Laurence Bristow-Smith, Kenny Craddock) - 4:23
 "My Love Is in America" (Chris Leslie) - 4:43
 "The Happy Man" (Traditional; arrangement by Chris Leslie) - 2:48
 "Portmeirion" (Ric Sanders)  - 5:56
 "The Crowd" (Anna Ryder)  - 6:09
 "The Banks of Sweet Primroses" (Traditional; arrangement Simon Nicol, Dave Pegg, Ric Sanders, Chris Leslie, Gerry Conway) - 4:27
 "The Deserter" (John Richards) - 6:55
 "The Light of Day" (Chris Leslie) - 6:11
 "I Wandered by a Brookside" (music: Barbara Berry/words: Traditional, from the Alfred Williams Collection, Swindon Library) - 4:52
 "Neil Gow's Apprentice" (Michael Marra) - 4:43
 "Everything but the Skirl" (Ric Sanders) - 4:05
 "Talking About My Love" (Chris Leslie, Nigel Stonier) - 2:40
 "Now Be Thankful" (Richard Thompson, Dave Swarbrick) - 3:45
 "The Crowd Revisited" (Anna Ryder) - 2:35

Personnel
Fairport Convention
 Simon Nicol – guitar, vocals
 Gerry Conway – percussion, drums
 Dave Pegg – bass guitar, vocals
 Chris Leslie – mandolin, violin, vocals, tenor banjo, electronic mandolin
 Ric Sanders – violin, electric piano, baritone violin

Additional personnel
 Ian Anderson – flute
 Cropredy Crowd – clapping
 Chris Knibbs – trombone
 Julie Matthews – vocals
 Chas McDevitt – trumpet
 Anna Ryder – piano, accordion, french horn, vocals, penny whistle
 Mark Tucker – electric guitar, e-bow
 Chris While – vocals

Production personnel
 Mark Tucker – producer, engineer, mixing
 John Dent – mastering
 Colin Edwards – photography
 Dave Pegg – producer
 Mick Toole – CD art adaptation, cover photo

Release history
 2002 : Woodworm Records CD, WRCD038 
 2002 : Compass Records CD, 4332
 2007 : Eagle Rock Records CD, 350

See also
Niel Gow's Oak – inspiration for the song "Neil Gow's Apprentice"

References

Fairport Convention albums
2002 albums